Șotânga is a commune in Dâmbovița County, Muntenia, Romania with a population of 6.880 people. It is composed of two villages, Șotânga and Teiș. The Șotânga Coal Mine was a local open-pit and underground lignite mine.

Natives
 Dona Dumitru Siminică

References

Communes in Dâmbovița County
Localities in Muntenia